Frances Fyfield (born 18 November 1948) is the pseudonym of Frances Hegarty, an English lawyer and crime-writer.

Biography
Born and brought up in Derbyshire, Hegarty was mostly educated in convent schools before reading English at Newcastle University. After graduating, she took a course in criminal law. She worked initially for the Metropolitan Police and later the Crown Prosecution Service. She claims "After a long diet of criminal law, including dangerous dogs, rape, mayhem and much, much murder, the indigestion of pity and fury provoked me to write. I wanted to write romance, but the domestically macabre always got in the way."

She has won several awards, including the Crime Writers' Association Duncan Lawrie Dagger for Blood From Stone in 2008 and the Silver Dagger for Deep Sleep. In addition, her novel, Safer than Houses was nominated for the Duncan Lawrie Dagger in 2006. She also writes psychological thrillers under the name of Frances Hegarty, among them, The Playroom, Half Light and Let's Dance, which was published in 1995. 

Her novels have been translated into 14 languages. Several have been adapted for television. Fyfield's Helen West series has twice been adapted for television. Juliet Stevenson played Helen West in Trial by Fire (1999) and Amanda Burton later took on the role in a successful British television series in 2002. 

Fyfield hosted the BBC Radio 4 programme Tales from the Stave until 2018. The programme looked at important music works using original scores and libretto.

Bibliography

Helen West novels
 A Question of Guilt (1988)  – nominated for an Edgar Award
 Trial by Fire (1990)  [US Title: Not That Kind of Place] – Rumpole Award
 Deep Sleep (1991)  – Silver Dagger Award
 Shadow Play (1993)  - Grand Prix de Littérature Policière
 A Clear Conscience (1994) 
 Without Consent (1996) 

Sarah Fortune novels
 Shadows on the Mirror (1989) 
 Perfectly Pure and Good (1994) 
 Staring at the Light (1999) 
 Looking Down (2004) 
 Safer Than Houses (2005) 
 Cold to the Touch (2009, Sphere) 

Diana Porteous novels

 Gold Digger (2012) 
 Casting the First Stone (2013) 
 Painted Smile (2015) 
 Welcome The Stranger (2017) 

Other novels
 Blind Date (1998) 
 Undercurrents (2000) 
 The Nature of the Beast (2001) 
 Seeking Sanctuary (2003) 
 The Art of Drowning (2006) 
 Blood From Stone (2008, Sphere)  – Duncan Lawrie Dagger Award

Novels as Frances Hegarty 
 The Playroom (1991) 
 Half Light (1992) 
 Let's Dance (1995)

Filmography
Helen West (2002; television series) 
The Blind Date (2000)
Trial by Fire (1999; TV)

References

1948 births
Living people
English people of Irish descent
English crime fiction writers
English thriller writers
People from Derbyshire
Alumni of Newcastle University
20th-century English novelists
21st-century British novelists
20th-century English women writers
21st-century English women writers
English women novelists
Women mystery writers
Women thriller writers